Christian Bickel (born 27 January 1991) is a German professional footballer who plays for an amateur side SV Blau-Weiß 91 Bad Frankenhausen as a midfielder.

Bickel was born in Bad Langensalza. Before joining Hansa Rostock, he played for SC Freiburg and was loaned out to SSV Jahn Regensburg.

References

External links 
 

1991 births
Living people
People from Bad Langensalza
German footballers
Footballers from Thuringia
Association football midfielders
Germany youth international footballers
2. Bundesliga players
3. Liga players
SC Freiburg players
SSV Jahn Regensburg players
FC Energie Cottbus II players
FC Energie Cottbus players
FC Hansa Rostock players
SC Paderborn 07 players
VfL Osnabrück players
Chemnitzer FC players